Serruria acrocarpa, the common rootstock spiderhead. is a flower-bearing shrub that belongs to the genus Serruria and forms part of the fynbos. The plant is native to the Western Cape and occurs from the Cederberg to the Southern Cape. The shrub grows to 50 cm in length and flowers in spring. The plant sprouts again after it has burned. The plant grows on plains and lower slopes of fynbos vegetation.

Gallery

References 

 Threatened Species Programme | SANBI Red List of South African Plants
 Serruria acrocarpa (Common rootstock spiderhead)
 Serruria acrocarpa

acrocarpa